Emily Rudge is a British rugby league player who plays for St Helens Women in the Women's Super League. Born in Warrington Rudge attended Cardinal Newman High School and first played rugby league for a local Warrington club before joining Thatto Heath Crusaders. While at Thatto Heath she was first selected for the England women's national rugby league team in 2008, aged 16.

At the end of the 2018 season Rudge was named captain of the England team for the test match against  and in 2019 was named as England captain for the World 9s tournament in Australia in October 2019 and also the two-match test series against  in November 2019.  In the first test match against Papua New Guinea on 9 November 2019 Rudge became the first England player to score four tries in a test match as England won 24–10.

Rudge was one of the three nominees for the 2019 Telegraph Woman of Steel award but lost out to Leeds' Courtney Hill.

Away from rugby Rudge is a PE teacher at a high school in St Helens. Rudge is married to Gemma Walsh who also played in the Women's Super League for St Helens' rivals Wigan Warriors Women.

Test match appearances
With her appearance in the October 2021 test match against France, Rudge equalled the record for most test match caps, 24, for England women's national rugby league team.

References

1990s births
Living people
England women's national rugby league team players
English female rugby league players
Schoolteachers from Merseyside
English LGBT sportspeople
Rugby league players from Warrington
Rugby league second-rows
St Helens Women RLFC players
Year of birth missing (living people)